Połcie Młode  is a village in the administrative district of Gmina Janowiec Kościelny, within Nidzica County, Warmian-Masurian Voivodeship, in northern Poland.

It is part of Stare Połcie (literally, in Polish : the old Połcie, Połcie Młode being Połcie the young).

References 

Villages in Nidzica County